Take Me Home is the first studio album by ZOX. It was released in 2003 on Zox Music.

Track listing
"The Squid"  – 4:57
"Butterfly"  – 4:01
"Ghostown"  – 3:23
"Goodbye to You"  – 3:47
"Leaving Me"  – 3:07
"Ode to the Mountain Pirates"  – 2:19
"Rain on Me"  – 4:16
"Homebody"  – 3:18
"Delicious"  – 3:32
"Stupid Song"  – 3:36	
"Cinco Ojos"  – 1:56
"Starry Night"  – 5:45
"Canon"  – 5:40
"Eventually"  – 2:58
"Spectacle Girl" (Hidden Track) – 4:42

References

2003 debut albums
ZOX albums